Sir Barry William Ife  (born 19 June 1947) was Principal of the Guildhall School of Music and Drama from 2004 to 2016 

He was educated at King's College London (BA, 1968) and Birkbeck, University of London (PhD 1984). He was knighted in the 2017 New Year Honours. He was the second principal of the Guildhall School of Music and Drama to be so honoured, the first being Sir Landon Ronald in 1922.

References

1947 births
Living people
Alumni of King's College London
Alumni of Birkbeck, University of London
Fellows of King's College London
Commanders of the Order of the British Empire
Knights Bachelor
Presidents of the Independent Society of Musicians